Zotalemimon borneoticum is a species of beetle in the family Cerambycidae. It was described by Stephan von Breuning in 1969.

References

borneoticum
Beetles described in 1969